Marta Martin Carrera-Ruiz (c. 1941 – 27 February 2021) was a Cuban-American television personality. She was known for among others, El Gordo y la Flaca.

Biography
Martin Carrera-Ruiz worked selling coffee to Univision personnel. When El Gordo  y la Flaca began during 1998, she was invited to prepare coffee to the show hosts and did so on live TV. For the next many years, she would be invited frequently to join the show on camera and comment during interviews to famous guests and also about entertainment news of the day.

Carrera-Ruiz died from COVID-19 on 27 February 2021, at age 80, during the COVID-19 pandemic in Cuba.

References

Cuban television personalities
American television personalities
Cuban women
American women television personalities
1941 births
2021 deaths
Place of birth missing
Place of death missing
Deaths from the COVID-19 pandemic in Cuba